Camp Renaissance was Civilian Conservation Corps camp NP-2 that was established on March 10, 1933, in the Gettysburg Battlefield's Pitzer Woods for reforestation (all 45 tents were blown down by a July 2 "twister").  On September 22, 1933, Captain Moran transferred to Camp Renaissance to become the Company 1332 commander, (his 1934 Company 385 of 199 workers was named the best camp/unit in subdistrict 8).  The camp with Company #385-C) in Pitzer Woods closed in April 1937  (Frank J. Slonaker, former president of the battlefield guide association, had been the camp's service officer).  

The Pitzer Woods site was subsequently used for  a July 5-9, 1941, encampment of the 71st Coast Artillery Regiment (Anti-Aircraft);  for a July 28, 1941, 68th Coast Artillery (AA) day camp; and for the 1943-4 Camp Sharpe training installation.

References

Civilian Conservation Corps in Pennsylvania
Civilian Conservation Corps camps